Rosa Rebelde is a Brazilian telenovela which was produced and broadcast by TV Globo. It premiered on 15 January 1969 and ended on 13 October 1969. It is the seventh "novela das oito" to be aired on the timeslot. It was created and written by Janete Clair, and directed by Daniel Filho. It was based on a radionovela, Rosa Malena, created by Janete Clair in collaboration with Radio Nacional.

Cast 
 Glória Menezes as Rosa Malena
 Tarcísio Meira as Captain Sandro
 Djenane Machado as Conchita
 Ênio Santos as José de Aragón
 Gracinda Freire as Rafaela
 José Augusto Branco as Pierre Duprat
 Maria Pompeu as Soledad Navarro
 Mário Lago as Barão de San Juan de la Cruz
 Miguel Carrano as Manolo
 Miriam Pires Baronesa as Inês de la Torre
 Moacyr Deriquém as Napoleão Bonaparte
 Myriam Pérsia as Maria Consuelo
 Paulo Araújo as Felipe Grandet
 Ribeiro Fortes as El Sordoa
 Sônia Ferrera as La Zíngara
 Suzana de Moraes as Lola

References

External links 

TV Globo telenovelas
1969 telenovelas
Brazilian telenovelas
1969 Brazilian television series debuts
1969 Brazilian television series endings
Portuguese-language telenovelas